The London Welbeck Hospital is a private hospital at 27 Welbeck Street, London.

History
The hospital was established in the early 20th century as a maternity hospital. Famous people born in the hospital included Sarah, Duchess of York in October 1959. It was relaunched by Dr Reza Ghanadian as a facility specialising in cosmetic surgery in the early 1990s.

References

External links 
 
 

Cosmetic surgery in the United Kingdom
Hospitals in London
Buildings and structures in the City of Westminster
Health in the City of Westminster
Plastic surgery
Private hospitals in the United Kingdom
Welbeck Street